James M. Carey (born May 31, 1974), is an American former professional ice hockey goaltender who played for the Washington Capitals, Boston Bruins, and St. Louis Blues in the National Hockey League (NHL). Carey was born in 
Dorchester, Massachusetts, but grew up in Weymouth, Massachusetts.

Playing career

Carey made his college hockey debut with the Wisconsin Badgers in 1992. He was the highest drafted goalie in the 1992 NHL Entry Draft, taken in the 2nd round, 32nd overall by the Washington Capitals. Before coming to Washington, Carey played in the World Junior Ice Hockey Championships in 1993 and played in the AHL with the Portland Pirates. In Portland, he took home numerous individual awards, including the Dudley "Red" Garrett Memorial Award as the top rookie in the AHL and the Aldege "Baz" Bastien Memorial Award for top netminder in the AHL. He was also selected to the First All-Star Team.

In 1994–95, Carey made his NHL debut in Washington and went undefeated in his first seven games. He would finish the season with an 18–6–3 record and was selected to the NHL All-Rookie team. This early success promoted him to Washington's starting goalie the following season – his best in the NHL. He played in 71 games, won 35, recorded 9 shutouts, and finished with a GAA of 2.26. He won the Vezina Trophy for his efforts and was selected to the NHL first All-Star team. 

The next fall, Carey was the backup to goalie Mike Richter on Team USA in the World Cup of Hockey. The United States would win the championship by beating Team Canada in three games.

In 1996–97 NHL season, Carey was traded midway through the season to the Boston Bruins in a blockbuster deal. Carey would never find his true form again in Boston and was sent down to the minors a year later with the Providence Bruins in the AHL. He signed on as a free agent at the end of the season with the St. Louis Blues and played four games before deciding he had enough of hockey.

Other
Due to the similarity of his given and surname to that of actor Jim Carrey, his nicknames were "The Mask", "Ace", and eventually "Net Detective", which were a play on Carrey's 1994 films, The Mask and Ace Ventura: Pet Detective.

Post-NHL career
Carey is the President and CEO of OptiMED Billing Solutions, Inc., a medical billing company, based out of Boston and Sarasota, Florida.

Awards and honors

Named WCHA Rookie of the Year in 1993.
Selected to the AHL First All-Star Team in 1995.
Dudley "Red" Garrett Memorial Award winner in 1995.
Aldege "Baz" Bastien Memorial Award winner in 1995.
Selected as Rookie of the Year by Hockey Star Presents in 1995.
Rated #19 in "The Top 50 Netminders in Pro Hockey" by Hockey Star Presents in 1995.
Selected to the NHL All-Rookie team in 1995.
Selected to the NHL first All-Star team in 1996.
Vezina Trophy winner in 1996.
Inducted into the Portland Pirates Hall of Fame in 2008.

Washington Capitals records
Career lowest GAA (2.37).
Lowest GAA in a single season (2.13 in 1995) - surpassed by Braden Holtby - 2.07) Source (NHL.com)
Tied for most penalty minutes in a playoff season (4 in 1995).
Tied for most shutouts in a single season (9 in 1996).

Transactions
June 20, 1992 – Drafted in the 2nd round, 32nd overall by the Washington Capitals in the 1992 NHL Entry Draft
March 1, 1997 – Traded by the Washington Capitals with Jason Allison, Anson Carter, and the Capitals' 3rd round selection (Lee Goren) in the 1997 NHL Entry Draft to the Boston Bruins for Adam Oates, Bill Ranford, and Rick Tocchet
March 1, 1999 – Signed by the St. Louis Blues

Career statistics

Regular season and playoffs

International

External links

1974 births
Living people
American men's ice hockey goaltenders
Boston Bruins players
Cincinnati Cyclones (IHL) players
Ice hockey people from Boston
Portland Pirates
Providence Bruins players
St. Louis Blues players
Sportspeople from Weymouth, Massachusetts
Vezina Trophy winners
Washington Capitals draft picks
Washington Capitals players
Wisconsin Badgers men's ice hockey players
American chief executives